United Nations Security Council resolution 1368, adopted unanimously on 12 September 2001, after expressing its determination to combat threats to international peace and security caused by acts of terrorism and recognising the right of individual and collective self-defense, the Council condemned the September 11 attacks in the United States.

The Security Council strongly condemned the attacks in New York City, Washington, D.C. and Pennsylvania and regarded the incidents as a threat to international peace and security. It expressed sympathy and condolences to the victims and their families and the United States government.

It was proposed by the French ambassador to the UN Jean-David Levitte.

The resolution called on all countries to co-operate in bringing the perpetrators, organisers and sponsors of the attacks to justice and that those responsible for supporting or harbouring the perpetrators, organisers and sponsors would be held accountable. The international community was called upon to increase efforts to suppress and prevent terrorist activities through co-operation and implementation of anti-terrorist conventions and Security Council resolutions, particularly Resolution 1269 (1999).

Resolution 1368 concluded with the Council expressing its readiness to take steps to respond to the attacks and combat all forms of terrorism in accordance with the United Nations Charter.

See also
 United Nations Security Council Resolution 1373
 United Nations Security Council Resolution 1377
 Aftermath of the September 11 attacks
 List of United Nations Security Council Resolutions 1301 to 1400 (2000–2002)
 Reactions to the September 11 attacks

References

External links
 
Text of the Resolution at undocs.org

 1368
2001 in the United States
Aftermath of the September 11 attacks
 1368
September 2001 events